The 1872 United States presidential election in Tennessee took place on November 5, 1872, as part of the 1872 United States presidential election. Voters chose 12 representatives, or electors to the Electoral College, who voted for president and vice president.

Tennessee voted for the Liberal Republican candidate, Horace Greeley, over Republican candidate, Ulysses S. Grant. Greely won Tennessee by a margin of 4.32%. However, Greely died prior to the Electoral College meeting, allowing for Tennessee's twelve electors to vote for the candidate of their choice.

Results

References

Footnotes

Tennessee
1872
1872 Tennessee elections